The Conglomerado Cualac is a geologic formation in Mexico. First described by Guzmán in 1959, under the name Cuarcita Cualac. Later, Erben (1956) gave it their actual name. It consist of thick beds of a hard, white and sometimes yellowish conglomerate with a cuarcitic matrix. This conglomerate compounds almost exclusively of milky quartz pebbles between .5 and 5 centimeters of diameter. It also presents in less quantity, pebbles of esquist, gneiss, and tuff. Its thickness varies between 30 and more than 200 meters. It preserves fossils dating back to the Jurassic period.

See also

 List of fossiliferous stratigraphic units in Mexico

References

Sources 

 

Jurassic Mexico